Bangalaia duffyi is a species of beetle in the family Cerambycidae. It was described by Stephan von Breuning in 1962. It is known from Sierra Leone and the Ivory Coast.

References

Prosopocerini
Beetles described in 1962